Tottenham is a constituency in Greater London represented in the House of Commons of the UK Parliament since 2000 by David Lammy of the Labour Party. Lammy has served as Shadow Secretary of State for Foreign, Commonwealth and Development Affairs since 2021 in the Shadow Cabinet of Keir Starmer, in which he previously served as Shadow Secretary of State for Justice and Shadow Lord Chancellor from 2020 to 2021. Tottenham was re-created as a parliamentary constituency in 1950, having previously existed from 1885 to 1918.

Boundaries 

1885–1918: The parish of Tottenham (and the area included in the Parliamentary Boroughs of Bethnal Green, Hackney, Shoreditch, and Tower Hamlets; for many wealthy voters this sub-provision gave a choice of which seat to vote for).

1918–1950: The Tottenham area was represented by the Tottenham North and  Tottenham South parliamentary constituencies. 

1950–1974: The Borough of Tottenham wards of Bruce Grove and Stoneleigh, Chestnuts, Green Lanes, Stamford Hill, Town Hall, and West Green.

1974–1983: The Borough of Haringey wards of Bruce Grove, Green Lanes, High Cross, Seven Sisters, South Tottenham, Tottenham Central, and West Green.

1983–2010: As above plus Coleraine, Harringay, Park, and White Hart Lane.

2010–present: Bruce Grove, Harringay, Northumberland Park, St Ann's, Seven Sisters, Tottenham Green, Tottenham Hale, West Green, White Hart Lane.

From 2018 (proposed): As above plus Stroud Green.

The constituency is in the London Borough of Haringey in north London, covering the borough's central and eastern area.

History

1885 to 1918

The seat, aided by the choice to wealthy voters owning property in the eastern metropolitan divisions to the south of exercising "the county franchise" (see definition above) sided with the Conservative party candidate until the January-to-February-held 1906 election, a party noted for the gradual social reforms of Benjamin Disraeli in the early 1880s, particularly in education and urban deprivation. By the time of the 1906 United Kingdom general election the Liberal Party was at its final apex and stood on the moral high ground on issues of free trade and abhorrences in the Boer War which turned the seat in the Liberal landslide result of that year to the party's candidate.  The two elections in 1910 (before a near eight-year long hiatus in elections due to World War I) were one-member parliamentary majority results nationally between the two then-dominant parties but the Liberal Party's People's Budget proposed at the first 1910 election saw Liberal incumbent Alden narrowly returned to serve Tottenham and again at the end of the year.

Since 1950
This constituency was recreated to cover a narrower, more focussed seat on the largest town or London District itself, of Tottenham.  Parts of two wards were in the former Borough of Hornsey which had a seat, abolished in 1983 to make way for Hornsey and Wood Green.

Political history
During its modern period of existence, Tottenham has been won consistently by the Labour Party; however, one member in the early 1960s, Alan Brown, defected to become independent in opposition and then, crossing the floor, became a Conservative. Brown failed by a wide margin to win re-election in 1964. The closest result since 1950 was in 1987 when the Labour Party candidate Bernie Grant retained the seat by 8.2% of the vote ahead of the Conservatives. The first by-election to Tottenham occurred in 2000 due to Grant's death, which saw Labour, with new candidate David Lammy, retain the seat with a reduced majority.

In 2005 and 2010 – reflecting a national swing – the runner-up was a Liberal Democrat candidate.

The re-election of Lammy in 2015 made the seat the twelfth-safest of Labour's 232 seats by percentage of majority; and third-safest in London. In 2017, Lammy was re-elected with 81.6% of the vote and a 70.1% majority, making Tottenham the safest seat for any party in Greater London.

At the 2016 EU referendum on continuing British membership of the European Union, 76.2% of the constituency voted to remain.

Prominent frontbenchers
David Lammy was the Minister of State for Higher Education and Intellectual Property from 2008 until Labour's defeat in the 2010 general election. Lammy served on the Shadow Cabinet as Shadow Justice Secretary and Shadow Lord Chancellor from 2020 until 2021, when he was reshuffled to serve as Shadow Secretary of State for Foreign, Commonwealth and Development Affairs.

Constituency profile 
A cosmopolitan, inner-city seat in the London Borough of Haringey, Tottenham has a large ethnic minority population – around a fifth of the residents are black, and there is a large Muslim population. Excluding the south of the constituency, the percentage of white residents understates the ethnic variety of this constituency, similar to the borough as a whole which includes major Cypriot, Irish, Eastern European, Jewish and Russian communities.  The seat includes the two Haringey metropolitan centres of Harringay and Tottenham. London football club Tottenham Hotspur F.C. is also based in the constituency.

The seat includes the district of Tottenham. The constituency also includes the Broadwater Farm estate which was notorious for the 1985 riots, following which the estate underwent a massive facelift and is no longer a crime blackspot, and Northumberland Park which is blighted by social problems, including overcrowding.

In the east of the area is the River Lea with its valley trail and the Tottenham marshes, while to the south the seat takes in Finsbury Park in Harringay.

Members of Parliament

MPs 1885–1918

MPs 1950–present

Elections

Elections in the 2010s

Elections in the 2000s

Elections in the 1990s

Elections in the 1980s

Elections in the 1970s

Elections in the 1960s

Elections in the 1950s

Elections in the 1910s

Elections in the 1900s

Elections in the 1890s

Elections in the 1880s

See also 
 2000 Tottenham by-election
 List of parliamentary constituencies in London

Notes

References

External links 
Politics Resources (Election results from 1922 onwards)
Electoral Calculus (Election results from 1955 onwards)

Parliamentary constituencies in London
Politics of the London Borough of Haringey
Constituencies of the Parliament of the United Kingdom established in 1885
Constituencies of the Parliament of the United Kingdom disestablished in 1918
Constituencies of the Parliament of the United Kingdom established in 1950
Tottenham